Nkosinathi Mankayi (born 23 December 1982), professionally known as Nathi, is a South African singer-songwriter and artist.

He shot to limelight upon the release of his critically acclaimed song titled "Nomvula" off his triple-platinum debut studio album Buyelekhaya. He later released his second album titled Umbulelo Wam on 28 October 2016. He is presently signed under Gallo Record Company.

Early life
Nkosinathi Mankayi was born among five siblings to a single mother in Mthatha, a small town in Eastern Cape, South Africa. He grew up in Maclear, Eastern Cape, South Africa where he was educated and developed an interest in music and drawing. In 2006, Nathi was sentenced to 8 years in prison for a 2002 robbery-related crime. He was however released after serving 4 years.

Career

2008–2014: Early beginnings
With the aim of pursuing a career in music, Nathi competed and won a local music competition known as "Dare to Dream". He had his share of luck in November 2014 after Vusi Nova heard him sing and insisted on featuring him on a song titled "Noma Kanjani", a song that was well received and went on to get massive airplay around South Africa. 

Nathi has one child born in 2017 and a sister who is also a singer.

2015–2017: Buyelekhaya and Umbulelo Wam
Nathi started recording his debut studio album titled Buyelekhaya in late 2014, releasing "Nomvula" as its lead single in 2015. Upon the release of the song, it became an instant hit, winning the "Best Selling Full-Track Download" at the 22nd South African Music Awards. On 10 March 2015, through Muthaland Entertainment, Nathi released Buyelekhaya to critical and commercial acceptance by going platinum within six weeks of its release, selling over 128,000 units. At the 22nd South African Music Awards, Nathi won five awards with Buyelekhaya winning the "Best-Selling Album of the Year" and "Best R&B / Soul / Reggae Album" categories.

On 28 October 2016, he released a 12-track sophomore album titled Umbulelo Wam. The album charted on #2 on iTunes and sold over 35,000 units.

2018-2022: Iphupha Labantu
He signed  a record deal with Gallo Record Company and release his third  studio album Iphupha Labantu on July 27, 2018.
The album won award for Best African Adult Contemporary Album at 25th South African Music Awards.

Discography

Studio albums

Singles

Awards and nominations

References

1982 births
Living people
South African singer-songwriters
21st-century South African male singers
People from the Eastern Cape
Xhosa people
Soul musicians